The Peace of Alais, also known as the Edict of Alès or the Edict of Grace, was a treaty negotiated by Cardinal Richelieu with Huguenot leaders and signed by King Louis XIII of France on 28 June 1629. It confirmed the basic principles of the Edict of Nantes but differed in that it contained additional clauses that stated that the Huguenots no longer had political rights and further demanded for them to relinquish all cities and fortresses immediately. 

It ended the religious warring and granting the Huguenots amnesty and guaranteed them tolerance. It did not last permanently, and Louis XIV resumed persecution of Protestants, culminating in the Revocation of the Edict of Nantes in 1685.

External links
New Catholic Dictionary
Huguenots in the Columbia Encyclopedia hosted by Bartleby
Huguenots at the Catholic Encyclopedia

Alais
Religion in the Ancien Régime
Huguenot rebellions
Gard
1629 in France
Christianity and law in the 17th century
1629 treaties
1629 in religion
Louis XIII
Cardinal Richelieu